William Justice may refer to:
William Wayne Justice (1920–2009), American jurist
William J. Justice (born 1942), American Roman Catholic bishop
William Justice (MP) (died 1521), English politician
 Richard Travis (actor), (1913-1989) American actor, born William Justice
Bill Justice (1914–2011), animator and engineer